Hollowick was a Canadian rock band from Oshawa, formerly called Rides Again.  It was composed of lead singer and guitarist Nathan Peyton, bassist and brother background vocalist Chad Peyton, lead guitarist Luke LeDoux, and drummer Frank Goerz. Their first full-length album, Into Existence, was released as Rides Again on 2 October 2007. The first single, "Wonder Why", was produced by Gavin Brown (known for producing other Canadian bands including Billy Talent and Three Days Grace). Videos and singles followed for Infected and It's Too Late, which received play on MuchMoreMusic. "Infected" became a top 10 modern rock hit in Canada.  The band has toured with Theory of a Deadman, Social Code, The Trews and Hedley, Yellowcard among others. A few years before "Into the Existence", Rides Again was known for their hit song "Geeze Louise", a pop rock song popular among young teens. The band was incorporated with Vodoo Records at this time, playing across southern Ontario. At this time the original drummer and cousin of Nathan and Chad, Bradley Christiansen, was in the band, but had left later on to pursue other career options. 2007 seemed to be the year for the striving Canadian band having their music videos published on Much Music, and Much More Music as well as radio stations across Canada. In mid-2009, Mike McElroy resigned as Rides Again drummer to pursue other importances. After Mike left they asked drummer and musician Kelly Voelkel to join the band, Kelly performed all of the drums and percussion on Hollowick's upcoming album. In July 2009 Kelly left to pursue more professional endeavours. Friend Anthony Moreino and former Rides Again merchandise guy filled in on drums for a short time for Hollowick, until new drummer Frank Goerz was found. With Goerz now behind the drum kit, there's a new level of explosive energy never felt before for Hollowick.

As of June 2010, the band performed under the name "Hollowick", with a new guitarist and drummer.  The album Beautiful People was released in 2011 and spawned the singles "Time Bomb" and "There Goes Another One."

Bassist Chad Peyton currently plays for Canadian country music award winner Meghan Patrick.

Singles
(Rides Again)"Wonder Why" - 2007
(Rides Again)"Infected" - 2008
(Rides Again)"It's Too Late" - 2008
(Rides Again)"Apology" - 2008
(Hollowick)"Time Bomb" - 2010
(Hollowick)"There Goes Another One" - 2011

Albums
2004 Rides Again
2006 Searching Tonight for Answers
2007 Into Existence
2011 Beautiful People

References

External links
 Hollowick official website
 Hollowick at MySpace

Musical groups established in 2004
Musical groups disestablished in 2013
Musical groups from Oshawa
Canadian rock music groups
2004 establishments in Ontario
2013 disestablishments in Ontario